The Peugeot 405 Turbo 16 is a coupé built by Peugeot Talbot Sport, derived from the Peugeot 405 and the Peugeot 205 Turbo 16 in 1988 for African rally raids. Driven by Ari Vatanen the four wheel drive car won the Paris Dakar rally in 1989 and 1990. It won the Pikes Peak International Hill Climb in 1988 driven by Vatanen in record-breaking time. The film  Climb Dance was made from the race.

It had four wheel steering, a feature never before seen on a rally or hillclimb car. The engine sat very low in front of the right rear wheel with the turbo charger on the opposite side. It had a very good power-to-weight ratio with more than 600 horsepower for a car weighing barely 900 kilograms and could accelerate from zero to 200 km/h in less than 10 seconds.  The car was backed by a $1 million-plus budget from Peugeot.

References

External links

405 Turbo-16
Rally cars
1980s cars